"Fuel to the Flame" is a song written by Dolly Parton and her uncle, Bill Owens. It was recorded and released as a single in 1967 by American country artist, Skeeter Davis.

The song helped to establish Dolly Parton as a major star in American country music. Along with the success of another song she co-wrote, "Put It Off Until Tomorrow", Parton was able to sign a recording contract with Monument Records as a music artist.

"Fuel to the Flame" was recorded at the RCA Victor Studio in Nashville, Tennessee, United States on June 15, 1966, nearly a year before its release. The session was produced by Felton Jarvis. This was one of the first sessions Jarvis would produce by Skeeter Davis. The song was released as a single the following year in January 1967. "Fuel to the Flame" became Davis' first major hit in two years, reaching a peak of number eleven on the Billboard Magazine Hot Country Singles chart. The song was later issued onto Davis' studio album, What Does It Take (To Keep a Man Like You Satisfied). Parton recorded a version of the song herself and included it on her debut album Hello, I'm Dolly.

Chart performance

References 

1967 songs
Skeeter Davis songs
Songs written by Dolly Parton
Song recordings produced by Felton Jarvis
RCA Victor singles
1967 singles